Horns and Halos may refer to:

Horns and Halos (Michael Monroe album)
Horns and Halos (Andre Nickatina album)
Horns and Halos (film)

See also
Halos & Horns